Network configuration and change management (NCCM) is a discipline in information technology. According to research from IDC and Gartner, NCCM is one of the fastest-growing markets in the ITOM (IT Operations Management) market. Organizations are using NCCM as a way to:

 automate changes;
 reduce network downtime;
 network device configuration backup & restore;
 meet compliance.

See also
 Change Management (ITSM)
 Computer networking

Information technology management
Computer networking